Elisa Stilson Magagna, pen name EC Stilson (born February 2, 1983) is an American publisher and editor, and was one of the founders of Wayman Publishing and Literati Publications. Stilson is also known for her memoirs, musical talents, and personal appearances speaking across the United States.

Biography
Stilson's father, Phil Stilson, was the president of a construction company, Most Wanted Drilling; her mother, Ruby Stilson, is an accountant and percussionist. Stilson's older siblings Julie Laub (a high school chemistry teacher) and Shane Stilson (a published author and mechanical engineer) were strong influences on the youth. The latter became an integral literary and social influence, always reading to Stilson and encouraging her to become a writer herself.

Stilson attended Brighton High School. After graduating from high school two trimesters early, Stilson traveled to Hawaii and became a homeless violinist with Cade Morris, who plays the guitar. Months later they returned to Utah, married, and had children. It was during 2001–2003 that Stilson wrote her first memoir, The Golden Sky. In 2001, her father was diagnosed with colon cancer. In 2003 her second child, a boy, died of birth defects after living 2½ months, and her marriage started failing. In 2005, in an effort to cope with stressful situations, Stilson went back to school and received her associate degree from Western International University. In the following decade, after getting divorced and being a single mom to four young children, Stilson wrote seven more novels under the pen name EC Stilson and also earned her bachelor's degree from Western Governors University.

In 2015 Stilson married Michael Magagna, former host of Utah After Hours (KWCR). The two moved to Idaho where Stilson was diagnosed with melanoma stage 2B in 2018. In 2020 this progressed to stage 4 melanoma and doctors projected Stilson would only live two years following this diagnosis.

While battling cancer, Stilson began blogging again, and her blog, “Crazy Life of a Writing Mom,” hit one million views.

Business

Stilson worked as a food server, shelved at a local library, worked as an auto parts specialist and mechanic on big rigs, and modeled.

It was during one particular modeling session that Stilson realized she had a knack for fashion design. While still attending the university, Stilson started her first two businesses, EC Boutique, a children's clothing company (2005–11) and Fifth Side Musical Performance (2005–present).

In 2007, after graduating from Western International University, Stilson began working more diligently to make her former business EC Boutique a success. She sewed 1 to 3 outfits each day until she'd built up an inventory of over 500 unique children's sets. From 2008 – 2011 EC Boutique was listed on eBay Pulse as a leading business in its industry. Stilson received numerous awards for her designs, but in her heart she longed to write.

In 2011, despite past criticism from creative writing teachers in high school, Stilson closed her sewing business, and pursued her writing career. She started a blog called Crazy Life of a Writing Mom. Instead of writing occasionally, she considered blogging a business endeavor and wrote every day for an entire year. She started with little-to-no followers, but gained over 24,000 social media followers by the end of 2011.

In 2011 Stilson met Dee Ready, a well-known editor and bestselling author previously published through Crown, Janie Goltz, a former newspaper reporter and editor, Joshua Carstens, who'd just graduated with an MA in professional writing, Lexie Lane, a well-known mompreneur, and Fran Fischer, a retired American artist. It was from the support of these people that Stilson found the strength and knowledge to found Wayman Publishing.

Since 2012, Stilson helped Wayman Publishing donate thousands of dollars from book sales to the Pregnancy Resource Center, Angel Watch—an infant loss bereavement organization—and the American Diabetes Association. In addition to this, Wayman's books received endorsements from authors, television producers, and politicians. Some of its most renowned book endorsers include Angela Santomero and Peter Greyson. Five of its books became Amazon bestsellers in 2012, many of them in large categories such as women's memoir.
Wayman Publishing went out of business in the fall of 2014.

From 2011 to 2013, several of Stilson's books were published, including The Sword of Senack, How to Lose a Tooth, and three memoirs in The Golden Sky series.

Personal life

Stilson remained married to Cade Morris, despite the hard times they encountered early in their married lives. The two performed music as part of Fifth Side Musical Performance until 2013 when they divorced. Stilson still plays her violin at signings, speaking engagements, weddings, and funerals. Stilson has four children who live with her and her husband Mike. She continues to write.

Bibliography
 How to Lose a Tooth (2011) 
 The Golden Sky (2011) 
 The Sword of Senack (2012) 
 Bible Girl & the Bad Boy (2012) 
 Best of ECWrites (2012)
 Homeless in Hawaii (2012) 
 How to Avoid Having Sex (2013)

Additional publication credits
 Christmas Lites I (2011) 
 Christmas Lites II (2012) 
 Open Doors: An Anthology (2012) 
 Open Doors: Fractured Fairy Tales (2012)

References

American book publishers (people)
American children's writers
American book editors
People from Price, Utah
1983 births
Living people
American women children's writers
21st-century American women